Tell Me Why is the second studio album by American country music artist Wynonna, released on Curb / MCA Records in 1993. It produced the hit singles "Only Love", "Is It Over Yet", "Rock Bottom", "Girls with Guitars", and the title track, all top ten hits on the Billboard country music charts. "Let's Make a Baby King" also charted at #61 based on unsolicited airplay. The title song also charted on the Billboard Hot 100 and Adult Contemporary charts.

Track listing

Personnel 
Adapted from AllMusic.

 Wynonna Judd – lead vocals, backing vocals (3)
 Steve Nathan – acoustic piano (1), Wurlitzer electric piano (4, 7–10), Hammond B3 organ (6)
 Matt Rollings – Hammond B3 organ (1, 4, 8), Wurlitzer electric piano (2, 10), acoustic piano (6)
 Barry Beckett – Hammond B3 organ (2)
 Billy Kirsch – acoustic piano (5)
 Karla Bonoff – acoustic guitar (1), backing vocals (1)
 Don Potter – acoustic guitar (1, 3, 6, 7, 9), electric guitar (4, 8, 10), rhythm guitar (4, 8)
 Steuart Smith – lead guitar (1, 4, 8, 10), rhythm guitar (1), electric guitar (2, 3, 4, 6, 7, 8, 10), acoustic guitar (7, 9)
 Steve Cropper – electric guitar (2)
 Marcus Hummon – acoustic guitar (3)
 Paul Franklin – steel guitar (9)
 Willie Weeks – bass (1–4, 6–10)
 Eddie Bayers – drums (1–4, 6–10) percussion (6)
 Terry McMillan – cowbell (1), tambourine (1), harmonica (9)
 Jim Horn – saxophones (4)
 Harvey Thompson – saxophones (4)
 George Tidwell – trumpets (4)
 Steve Dorff – string arrangements and conductor (3, 5)
 Kenny Edwards – backing vocals (1)
 Wendy Waldman – backing vocals (1)
 Bob Bailey – backing vocals (2, 4, 6)
 Kim Fleming – backing vocals (2, 4, 6)
 Suzy Willis – backing vocals (2, 4, 6)
 Chris Rodriguez – backing vocals (3, 6)
 Naomi Judd – backing vocals (7, 8)
 Lyle Lovett – backing vocals (7)
 Jesse Winchester – backing vocals (8)

Production 
 Tony Brown – producer 
 Don Potter – associate producer 
 Chuck Ainlay – recording, overdub recording (2-10), mixing, mastering
 Clark Germain – overdub recording (1)
 Jim Champange – overdub recording assistant (1)
 Russ Martin – overdub recording (2-10)
 Warren Peterson – overdub recording (2-10)
 Robert Fernandez – string recording (3, 5)
 Graham Lewis – second engineer 
 Nick Sparks – second engineer
 Robert Charles – second engineer (7)
 Larry Jefferies – second engineer (7)
 Craig White – second engineer (7)
 Denny Purcell – mastering 
 Jessie Noble – project coordinator 
 Virginia Team – art direction 
 Jerry Joyner – design 
 Randee St. Nicholas – photography 
 Earl Cox/Trumps – hair 
 Mary Beth Felts – make-up 
 Vanessa Ware – stylist 
 Ken Stilts Company, Inc. – management

Studios
 Recorded at Emerald Sound Studio (Nashville, TN).
 Overdubbed at Emerald Sound Studio, Backstage Studio, Javelina Recording Studio and Ocean Way Nashville (Nashville, TN).
 Strings recorded at Warner Bros. Scoring Stage 1 (Los Angeles, CA).
 Mixed at Masterfonics (Nashville, TN).
 Mastered at Georgetown Masters (Nashville, TN).

Charts and certifications

References

1993 albums
Curb Records albums
Wynonna Judd albums
MCA Records albums
Albums produced by Tony Brown (record producer)